is the fourth single by L'Arc-en-Ciel, released on October 20, 1995 it reached number 22 on the Oricon chart. The title track is a remake of the song "Natsu no Yuu-utsu" from the album, it is longer with different and additional lyrics as well as new music. The single was re-released on August 30, 2006.

Track listing

Chart positions

References

Songs about parting
1995 singles
L'Arc-en-Ciel songs
Songs written by Hyde (musician)
Songs written by Ken (musician)
Japanese-language songs
1995 songs
Ki/oon Music singles